Dayami Sanchez Savon (born 14 March 1994) is a Cuban female volleyball player. She is a member of the Cuba women's national volleyball team and played for Ciudad Habana.

Career 
She was part of the Cuban national team at the 2014 FIVB World Grand Prix, 2014 FIVB Volleyball Women's World Championship, 2015 FIVB Volleyball Women's U23 World Championship, 2015 FIVB World Grand Prix, and the 2016 FIVB World Grand Prix.

Clubs 
 2010-2015 Centrales
 2015-2017 Ciudad Habana
 2017-2018 Le Cannet
 2019-2020 UTE Budapest
 2019-2020 Gimcheon Korea Expressway Hi-Pass
 2020-2021 SC Prometey
 2020-2021 Béziers Volley

References

External links 
 http://www.cev.lu/Competition-Area/PlayerDetails.aspx?TeamID=10582&PlayerID=71610&ID=1037
 http://www.lnv.fr/joueurs/3194/dayami-sanchez-savon.html

1994 births
Living people
Cuban women's volleyball players
Place of birth missing (living people)
Volleyball players at the 2015 Pan American Games
Pan American Games competitors for Cuba
Wing spikers
21st-century Cuban women